L'isola is an Italian television series, directed by Alberto Negrin.

See also
List of Italian television series

External links
 

Italian television series
2012 Italian television series debuts
2013 Italian television series endings
2010s Italian television series
RAI original programming